Bruce Stuart Gelb (born February 24, 1927) is an American businessman and diplomat. He is the retired president of Clairol and former vice chairman of Bristol-Myers Squibb.

Early life and education
Gelb was born in New York City on February 24, 1927. His father, Lawrence M. Gelb, founded Clairol in 1931. Gelb attended Phillips Academy in Andover, Massachusetts. In 1941, at the academy, Gelb met George H. W. Bush. Gelb was in the military and went on to receive a B.A. from Yale in 1950 and an M.B.A. from Harvard in 1953.

Appointments
Director of the United States Information Agency (George H.W. Bush) from 1989 to 1991
Ambassador to Belgium (George H. W. Bush) from 1991 to 1993
Commissioner for the United Nations, Consular Corps and International Business (Mayor Rudolph W. Giuliani) from 1994 to 1997
Board of Trustees of the Woodrow Wilson International Center for Scholars (George W. Bush) 2003-2006

He has been a Vice Chairman of the Executive Committee of the Madison Square Boys and Girls Club; a Life Trustee of Choate Rosemary Hall; a board member of the United Nations Development Corporation; a member of the Board of Trustees of the American Council on Science and Health; Honorary Chairman and a Regent of the Center for Security Policy; and a member of the Advisory Board of the USC Center on Public Diplomacy.

References

External links

1927 births
Living people
American businesspeople
Choate Rosemary Hall alumni
Yale University alumni
Harvard Business School alumni
Ambassadors of the United States to Belgium
Gelb family